Ekaterina Makarova was the defending champion, but chose not to participate this year.

Daniela Hantuchová won the title, defeating Ajla Tomljanović in the final, despite being two match points down against Marina Erakovic in the third set in the semifinal. This was Hantuchová's final WTA tour singles title, before her retirement in 2017.

Seeds

Draw

Finals

Top half

Bottom half

Qualifying

Seeds

Qualifiers

Lucky losers

Draw

First qualifier

Second qualifier

Third qualifier

Fourth qualifier

References 
 Main Draw
 Qualifying Draw

Singles
PTT Thailand Open - Singles
 in women's tennis